The national federation became a FIFA affiliate in 1980.  The development of women's football in the Middle East and central Asia dates back only about ten years.

National Team

The Oman women's national football team is the official women's national football team of the Sultanate of Oman. The team is run by the Oman Football Association, the main governing body of football in Oman.

History

Like most of its Arab neighbours, including the fellow countries in the Gulf Cooperation Council, Oman has a long history of discrimination against women, thus women's sport in Oman has struggled to coexist with their men's counterpart. Although Oman has made better progresses than some of her neighbours about women's rights and has a more relaxed law, women's sports, including football, remain obsolete for many Omani women by 2015.

Several initiatives to promote football have been made as far as early 2000s, in which football is emphasised. In 2015, the OFA officially established the Women's Football Department. In 2018, Maha Janoub, a Syrian woman who became the first woman to coach a men's team in West Asia, expressed her desire to plant the women's football seed in Oman and has been working with the Omani officials to materialise this from the grassroots. In 2020, several progresses have been made with over 30 women's teams and 16 women's clubs in all level, though none of them have been professional so far. Currently, Oman has no official women's football league.

In August 2021, Oman's neighbour Saudi Arabia announced the creation of a new women's team and appointed a new manager, in response to the growing interests toward women's football in the region. Due to the influence of Saudi Arabia in the regional nations of the GCC and the country's main newspaper, Arab News, have called for the development of women's football across the Arab countries, it is expected that Oman may field a future women's national team. In response, at the same month, Oman began the process to establish a full-time women's football team.

In May 2022, Oman unveiled its women's futsal team for the first time ever (which was wrongly labelled as its football team in various Omani media) to take part in the 2022 WAFF Women's Futsal Championship held in Saudi Arabia; nonetheless this is also an indication of growing interest toward a potential official women's football team to be fully established by the Omani officials.

Competitive record

FIFA Women's World Cup

*Draws include knockout matches decided on penalty kicks.

AFC Women's Asian Cup

*Draws include knockout matches decided on penalty kicks.

Summer Olympics

*Draws include knockout matches decided on penalty kicks.

Asian Games

*Draws include knockout matches decided on penalty kicks.

WAFF Women's Championship

Other representative teams

Baroucher
In 2006, a team representing the country, Baroucher, played in the Women's Sevens Tournament in Abu Dhabi. The tournament was a seven-a-side one and they were in Group A, where they finished last overall. On 21 February, they lost 1–5 to Abu Dhabi.  On 23 February, they lost 2–3 to a team from Jordan. On 24 February, they lost 0–3 to Iraq.  On 25 February, they lost to Syria 0–9.  In group play, they had a total of 3 goals for and 20 against.

Five A Side
In 2006, Oman hosted and played in a 5-a-side women's championship.  Other countries participating in the tournament included Pakistan, Bahrain, Syria, Palestine, United Arab Emirates, Lebanon, Afghanistan.

Futsal
A club team representing the country participated in the fifth Amman Arab Women's Futsal Championships in Jordan.

In June 2022, the Oman women's national futsal team made a history by debuting in the 2022 WAFF Women's Futsal Championship, the first ever competitive women's football team of the country to participate in the tournament. Oman finished bottom in the group, losing all two games in their maiden appearance.

References

Football in Oman
Women's sport in Oman